Moshe Wilensky (also, "Vilensky"; 17 April 1910 – 2 January 1997) was a Polish-Israeli composer, lyricist, and pianist. He is considered a "pioneer of Israeli song" and one of Israel's leading composers, and was a winner of the Israel Prize, the state's highest honor.

Life
Wilensky, who was Jewish, was born in Warsaw, Poland, the son of Zelig and Henia (née Liebman).  He studied music at the Warsaw Conservatory in Warsaw, specializing in conducting and composition, and immigrated to Palestine in 1932.  He married Bertha Yakimovska in 1939. Wilensky died in 1997.

Music career
A pianist and composer, Wilensky wrote music for theaters and musical troupes of the Israel Defense Forces, including the Nahal choir in the 1950s. He worked with the Kol Yisrael orchestra.

Wilensky's music combines Slavic music and Eastern music. He composed for films, plays, hora dances, cabaret songs, and children's tunes, writing nearly 1,500 songs in his lifetime. Among his songs are "Kalaniyot" ("Anemones"), "Hayu Zmanim" ("In Those Times)", "Autumn," "Ring Twice and Wait," "Each Day I Lose," "The Last Battle", and "Mul Har Sinai" ("Opposite Mt. Sinai"). He wrote music for many of Natan Alterman's poems. In 1962, Israeli Esther Reichstadt won second prize at the Polish international song festival, which Wilensky hosted, with his song "Autumn".

In 1983, Wilensky was awarded the Israel Prize, for Hebrew song (melody). In 1990, a special concert in honor of his 80th birthday was given by the Israel Philharmonic Orchestra.  In 1998, the Society of Authors, Composers and Music Publishers in Israel (ACUM) named its Song of the Year Award the "Moshe Wilensky Prize".

See also
List of Israel Prize recipients

References

External links
Jewish Agency bio

1910 births
1997 deaths
Composers in the Palestine mandate
Israeli composers
Israeli lyricists
Israeli pianists
Israel Prize in Hebrew song recipients
Polish emigrants to Mandatory Palestine
Chopin University of Music alumni
Jewish composers
Polish composers
20th-century Polish pianists
Musicians from Warsaw
Israeli military musicians
Burials at Kiryat Shaul Cemetery
20th-century Polish Jews